The Kruševo Manifesto is a presumable manifesto published by the Revolutionary Committee of Kruševo Republic during the 1903 Ilinden-Preobrazhenie Uprising. It was calling upon the Muslim population to join forces with the republican government in the struggle against tyranny and to attain democratic form of statehood. It urged that the uprising was against the Sultanate, and was not religiously or ethnically based. More, this manifesto is cited  by modern Macedonian historiography as historical example of the use of a separate Macedonian language during the uprising. However there is no original preserved and its historical authenticity is disputed. Macedonian historiography refers to a text that was compiled about twenty years after the events. It was published in 1923 by Nikola Kirov in Sofia in his native dialect, as part from a play. In fact at the turn of the 20th century there were only a few researchers who claimed that a separate Macedonian language existed. Though, Macedonian historians object to Kirov's classification of then Krusevo's Slavic population as Bulgarian.

References

External links

The Macedonian and English translations of the Manifesto

Manifesto
Manifesto
1903 in Bulgaria
Macedonia under the Ottoman Empire
Internal Macedonian Revolutionary Organization
Bulgarian plays